The Hamdanid dynasty was an Islamic Arab dynasty of Northern Mesopotamia and Syria (890–1004). They descended from the ancient Banu Taghlib tribe of Mesopotamia and Arabia.

History
The Hamdanid dynasty was founded by Hamdan ibn Hamdun. By 892–893, he was in possession of Mardin, after fighting the Kharijites of the Jazira. In 895, Caliph al-Mutadid invaded and Hamdan fled Mardin. 

Hamdan's son, Husayn, who was at Ardumusht, joined the caliph's forces. Hamdan later surrendered to the caliph and was imprisoned. In December 908, Husayn conspired to establish Ibn al-Mu'tazz as Caliph. Having failed, Husayn fled until he asked for mediation through his brother Ibrahim. Upon his return, he was made governor of Diyar Rabi'a. In 916, Husayn, due to a disagreement with vizier Ali b. Isa, revolted, was captured, imprisoned, and executed in 918.

Hamdan's other son, Abdallah, was made governor of Mosul in 905–906. He conducted campaigns against the Kurds in that region and in 913–914, was dismissed from his post and subsequently revolted. Abdallah submitted himself to Mu'nis, and with his pardon was made governor of Mosul in 914–915. During his brother Husayn's revolt, both he and his brother Ibrahim were temporarily imprisoned. By 919, Abdallah was commanding an army against Yusuf b. Abi l'Sadj, governor of Adharbaydjan and Armenia.

The rule of Hassan Nasir al-Dawla (929–968), governor of Mosul and Diyar Bakr, was sufficiently tyrannical to cause him to be deposed by his own family.

His lineage still ruled in Mosul, a heavy defeat by the Buyids in 979 notwithstanding, until 990. After this, their area of control in northern Iraq was divided between the Uqaylids and the Marwanids.

Ali Sayf al-Dawla 'Sword of the State' ruled (945–967) northern Syria from Aleppo, and became the most important opponent of the Christian Byzantine Empire's re-expansion. His court was a centre of culture, thanks to its nurturing of Arabic literature, but it lost this status after the Byzantine conquest of Aleppo.

To stop the Byzantine advance, Aleppo was put under the suzerainty of the Fatimids in Egypt, but in 1003 the Fatimids deposed the Hamdanids.

Hamdanid rulers
Hamdanids in Al-Jazira
Hamdan ibn Hamdun
al-Husayn ibn Hamdan (895–916)
Abdallah ibn Hamdan (906–929)
Nasir al-Dawla (929–967)
Abu Taghlib (967–978)
 Directly administered as part of the Buyid-controlled Abbasid Caliphate, 979–981
Abu Tahir Ibrahim ibn Nasir al-Dawla (989–990)
Abu Abdallah al-Husayn ibn Nasir al-Dawla (989–990)
 Deposed by the Uqaylid chieftain Muhammad ibn al-Musayyab

Hamdanids in Aleppo
Sayf al-Dawla (945–967)
Sa'd al-Dawla (967–991)
Sa'id al-Dawla (991–1002)
 Deposed by the ghulam Lu'lu' al-Kabir

See also
Rulers of Aleppo
List of Shi'a Muslim dynasties
Mirdasids

References

Sources

Further reading

Hukam (Arabic)

 
Arab dynasties
Upper Mesopotamia under the Abbasid Caliphate
History of Turkey
Shia dynasties
States and territories established in the 890s
890 establishments
States and territories disestablished in the 1000s